Scentura also known as Scentura Creations is a perfume company based in the city of Chamblee, Georgia, within the Atlanta metropolitan area. It is a multilevel selling company  which manufactures inexpensive imitations of designer fragrances. Independent salespeople are sent out, often in pairs, to sell perfume door-to-door, in parking lots, malls, or in other retail stores.

History
Larry Hahn is the founder of Scentura Creations. The company itself began in 1975 as W.M. Industries Inc. (WMI). WMI was a door-to-door retail business which sold products such as luggage, toys and perfume.
  
In a 1984 motivation film, Hahn described his early experience:

In 1975, with loans from friends, Hahn purchased his first product: 31-piece sets of bakeware.  For several years Hahn trained new recruits himself.  By the 1980s there were thousands of distributors.

Johnny Whitworth, a distributor of Larry Hahn, left the company to start his own perfume company, World Perfume in Dallas, Texas.

Business model
Every manager and perfume salesperson must first sign an independent contract. Scentura representatives state that because these are independent contractors, Scentura is not responsible for either the ads or the tactics used by salespeople. Linda Fucci, a former administrative aide to Hahn and distributor, stated that "The independent contractor concept was preconceived before the first truck load was ordered in. It was already planned out before we ever opened up."

Scentura distributors recruit salespeople by placing classified advertisements in the employment section of the newspaper under the heading of "Management". Turnover tends to be very high. Training is from six to eight weeks.

There are reports that new salespeople are offered a salary upon completion of training and are later disappointed to discover that the salary contract requires a quota of sales as a condition of payment. They soon discover no one takes the contract and opt to be a reseller of the rendition fragrances where they earn money from the profits of perfume sales.  The only income is from selling knock off perfume door-to-door or in parking lots. Employees are also sometimes encouraged by independent distributors to lie about the products they are selling. Independent salespeople have been in trouble with police for soliciting without a permit.

Lawsuit
In 1999 Scentura Creations, Inc sued Daniel J. Long, a former distributor, for $31,236.44, the cost of perfume which had been delivered to distributors recruited by Long.  In 2001, the Illinois Appellate Court ruled that the contract between Scentura and Long was a "pyramid sales scheme", violated the law and was unenforceable under the Consumer Fraud and Deceptive Business Practices Act.  The appellate court ruled that Long was not liable for products in the possession of other distributors.

See also

Notes

Further reading
Resources for further research on Scentura Creations
Richmond Times-Dispatch, Va., Consumer Watch Column  06/08/2002 Richmond Times-Dispatch (Richmond, Virginia).
 
 
 
 
 Alternate link 
 Alternate link

External links

Business models
Multi-level marketing companies
Perfume houses
Retail companies established in 1975
1975 establishments in Georgia (U.S. state)
Pyramid and Ponzi schemes